Washington County is a county in the U.S. state of Indiana. As of the 2010 United States Census, the population was 28,262. The county seat (and the county's only incorporated city) is Salem.

Washington County is part of the Louisville metropolitan area.

History
In 1787, the fledgling United States defined the Northwest Territory, which included the area of present-day Indiana. In 1800, Congress separated Ohio from the Northwest Territory, designating the rest of the land as the Indiana Territory. President Thomas Jefferson chose William Henry Harrison as the territory's first governor, and Vincennes was established as the territorial capital. After the Michigan Territory was separated and the Illinois Territory was formed, Indiana was reduced to its current size and geography.

In 1790 Knox County was laid out. In 1801, Clark County was established, and in 1808 Harrison County was laid out, including the territory of the future Washington County.

Starting in 1794, Native American titles to Indiana lands were extinguished by usurpation, purchase, or war and treaty. The United States acquired land from the Native Americans in the Treaty of Grouseland (1805), by which a large portion of the southern Indiana Territory became property of the government. This included the future Washington County. As early as 1802, a man named Frederick Royce lived among the Ox Indians at a place known as the Lick, two miles east of Salem and is probably the first white man to inhabit this county. He was a hunter-trader and salt manufacturer. In 1803, Thomas Hopper settled in this county near Hardinsburg. Washington County was created by act of the Territorial legislature dated 21 December 1813, taking territory from Harrison and Clark counties. Interim commissioners were named and directed to determine the proper choice of the seat of government. Accordingly, they began deliberating in January 1814, and by 2 February had selected an uninhabited site near the center, naming it 'Salem'. In the territorial act creating the county, it was named for U.S. President George Washington, who had died fourteen years earlier.

On 1 September 1814 the original boundary of Washington County was increased, by act of the Territorial legislature, but on 26 December 1815 much of this added territory was partitioned off to create Orange and Jackson counties. In December 1816 the Indiana Territory was admitted to the Union as a state. On 12 January 1820 the state partitioned a further portion of Washington County to create Scott County. In 1842, and again in 1873, the border between Scott and Washington counties was adjusted.

In 1808 the first Black settlers arrived in the area along with white Quakers. In 1815 they established the Blue River Meeting House northeast of Salem. By 1850, 252 Black people had settled in the county, mainly living in Posey and Washington townships. The passing into law in 1851 of a new state constitution, in which, Article 13 excluded further settlement of Black and mixed-race persons was indicative of increasing hostility towards this population and saw a decline in Black residents of the county to 187 by 1860. In Posey Township, the population of 90 Black people in 1850 had decreased to zero by 1860.

Whitecapping, the process by which rural citizens used threats or extralegal violence to force Black people out of the region, continued in Washington County during the Civil War. In December 1864 John Williams, a prosperous Black farmer in the county, was shot dead in the doorway of his home. In 1867 Alexander White, an elderly man, was stabbed to death in Salem after repeatedly ignoring the threats of white attendees to quit coming to their church. These lynchings convinced people the county was not safe and contributed to a continual exodus of Black people from the county. In 1870, 18 Black people remained in the county, and by 1880 only three remained.

Salem, the county seat, had become a sundown town by 1898 at the latest. By the 20th century the entire county was officially sundown. A county history from 1916 declared that, “Washington County has for several decades boasted that no colored man or woman lived within her borders.” Sundown signs existed in the county, with one located near Canton, east of Salem. Law enforcement would not allow Black people to stop in Salem, and would escort them to the county line. Washington County remained sundown until 1990 at the latest, when 15 Black people were recorded living in Salem on that year's census.

Geography
The low rolling hills of Washington County were tree-covered before settlement, but have been largely cleared and devoted to agriculture, although drainage areas are still wooded. The north portion of the county is drained by the Muscatatuck River, which forms the eastern portion of the county's north border. The East Fork of the White River joins the Muscatatuck near the center of the county's north line. The south part of the county is drained by the Blue River, which rises in the county and flows southwestward into Harrison County on its way to the Ohio River. The highest point on the terrain ( ASL) is an isolated rise  NNW from New Philadelphia in the eastern part.

Adjacent counties

 Jackson County − north
 Scott County − northeast
 Clark County − east
 Floyd County − southeast
 Harrison County − south
 Crawford County − southwest
 Orange County − west
 Lawrence County − northwest

Communities

City
 Salem

Towns

 Campbellsburg
 Hardinsburg
 Little York
 Livonia
 New Pekin
 Saltillo

Unincorporated communities

 Bartle
 Beck's Mill
 Blue River
 Brimstone Corners
 Bunker Hill
 Canton
 Claysville
 Daisy Hill
 Fairview
 Farabee
 Fayetteville
 Fredericksburg
 Georgetown
 Gooseport
 Haleysbury
 Harristown
 Highland
 Hitchcock
 Kossuth
 Martinsburg
 McKinley
 Millport
 Mount Carmel
 New Liberty
 New Philadelphia
 New Salem
 Old Pekin
 Organ Springs
 Plattsburg
 Prowsville
 Pumpkin Center
 Rosebud
 Rush Creek Valley
 Shorts Corner
 Smedley
 South Boston

Townships

 Brown
 Franklin
 Gibson
 Howard
 Jackson
 Jefferson
 Madison
 Monroe
 Pierce
 Polk
 Posey
 Vernon
 Washington

Major highways

  U.S. Route 150
  Indiana State Road 39
  Indiana State Road 56
  Indiana State Road 60
  Indiana State Road 66
  Indiana State Road 135
  Indiana State Road 160
  Indiana State Road 256
  Indiana State Road 335
  Indiana State Road 337

Climate and weather

Five people were reported killed in Washington County during the tornado outbreak of March 2–3, 2012. Four were found dead in a home on Old Pekin Road according to Washington County officials. The fifth, a 15-month-old from the same family, had been found in a field, and died later in hospital.

Government

The county government is a constitutional body, and is granted specific powers by the Constitution of Indiana, and by the Indiana Code.

County Council: The legislative branch of the county government; controls spending and revenue collection in the county. Representatives are elected to four-year terms from county districts. They set salaries, the annual budget, and special spending. The council has limited authority to impose local taxes, in the form of an income and property tax that is subject to state level approval, excise taxes, and service taxes.

Board of Commissioners: The executive body of the county; commissioners are elected county-wide, to staggered four-year terms. One commissioner serves as president. The commissioners execute the acts legislated by the council, collect revenue, and manage the county government.

Court: There are two judges in Washington County. The Judge of the Circuit Court is the Hon. Robert L. Bennett (D). The Judge of the Superior Court is the Hon. Frank E. Newkirk, Jr. (R). Case distribution is determined by local court rules. Each judge serves a six-year term.

County Officials: The county has other elected offices, including sheriff, coroner, auditor, treasurer, recorder, surveyor, and circuit court clerk. These officers are elected to four-year terms. Members elected to county government positions are required to declare party affiliations and to be residents of the county.

Washington County is part of Indiana's 9th congressional district and is represented in Congress by Republican Trey Hollingsworth.

Demographics

2010 census
As of the 2010 United States Census, there were 28,262 people, 10,850 households, and 7,799 families in the county. The racial makeup of the county was 98.1% white, 0.3% Asian, 0.2% American Indian, 0.2% black or African American, 0.3% from other races, and 0.9% from two or more races. Those of Hispanic or Latino origin made up 1.1% of the population. In terms of ancestry, 25.2% were German, 14.3% were American, 13.7% were Irish, and 9.6% were English.

Of the 10,850 households, 34.7% had children under the age of 18 living with them, 54.8% were married couples living together, 11.1% had a female householder with no husband present, 28.1% were non-families, and 23.7% of all households were made up of individuals. The average household size was 2.58 and the average family size was 3.02. The median age was 39.2 years.

The median income for a household in the county was $47,697 and the median income for a family was $45,500. Males had a median income of $38,100 versus $28,092 for females. The per capita income for the county was $19,278. About 12.2% of families and 16.9% of the population were below the poverty line, including 24.7% of those under age 18 and 14.9% of those age 65 or over.

Education
The county is served by 3 school districts:
 Salem Community Schools
 East Washington School Corporation
 South Central Area Special Ed
 West Washington School Corporation.

East Washington School Corporation (Superintendent:Steve Darnell) includes:
 East Washington Elementary School
 East Washington Middle School
 Eastern High School

Salem Community Schools (Superintendent:Dr. D. Lynn Reed) includes:)
 Salem High School
 Salem High School
 Salem Middle School
 Bradie Shrum Elementary School

West Washington School Corporation (Superintendent:Gerald Jackson) includes:)
 West Washington Elementary School
 West Washington Junior/Senior High School

See also
 Louisville-Jefferson County, KY-IN Metropolitan Statistical Area
 Louisville/Jefferson County–Elizabethtown–Bardstown, KY-IN Combined Statistical Area
 National Register of Historic Places listings in Washington County, Indiana

References
Specific

General
 American Legion Pekin Post 203, The. History of Pekin, Indiana (1959). The American Legion Pekin Post 203
 Everton Publishers, Inc, The. Handy book for Genealogists (1971). Everton Publishers, Inc.
 History of Washington County 1884 (1884).
 Indiana Historical Commission. Indiana History Bulletin (August 1924). Wm. B. Burford
 B. F. Bowen & Co., Indianapolis, Indiana. Centennial History of Washington County, Indiana: Its People, Industries and Institution (1916). Warder W. Stevens

External links
 Washington County Government website

 
Indiana counties
1814 establishments in Indiana Territory
Populated places established in 1814
Louisville metropolitan area
Sundown towns in Indiana